Daughter of Darkness is a 1990 American made-for-television supernatural horror film directed by Stuart Gordon and starring Anthony Perkins, Mia Sara, Dezsõ Garas and Jack Coleman. It originally premiered on CBS on January 26, 1990.

Plot
Katherine Thatcher (Mia Sara), a young woman trying to learn the identity of her father, is drawn into a Romanian vampire underworld. She is unaware that her father (Perkins) is a vampire. The vampire community is surprised to find that someone has been born from a union between a vampire and a woman and they seek to draw her into their plans.

Cast
Anthony Perkins - Anton/Prince Constantine
Mia Sara - Katherine Thatcher
Robert Reynolds - Grigore
Dezsõ Garas - Max
Jack Coleman - Devlin
Erika Bodnár - Nicole		
Ági Margittay - Ági Margitai	
Mari Kiss - Elena

Production
The film featured actors Anthony Perkins, Mia Sara and Jack Coleman. Director Stuart Gordon originally scouted locations in Romania for the film but later chose to shoot on location in Hungary.

Release
Daughters of Darkness was shown on CBS on January 26, 1990.

Reception
Jon Burlingame commented on the film in the Intelligencer Journal, noting the film's political elements, such as setting the film in Romania four months before democracy was brought to the country. However, Burlingame said that the film eventually succumbed to "standard horror-film conventions" and that Anthony Perkins "is reduced to doing a bad Bela Lugosi imitation, albeit heroically." Rick Kogan of the Chicago Tribune also commented on Perkins, stating he was beginning to "look and act as haggard and haunted as if he really had been living at the Bates Motel (don't even wonder how goofy his accent is here)." Kogan found that Gordon's "expansive and clever horror-habits are muted and constrained by the small screen."

References

External links 
 
  
 

1990 television films
1990 films
1990 horror films
American supernatural horror films
American horror television films
CBS network films
Films directed by Stuart Gordon
Films scored by Colin Towns
Films shot in Hungary
1990s supernatural horror films
1990s American films